Robin Hood of Texas is a 1947 American Western film directed by Lesley Selander and written by John K. Butler and Earle Snell. The film stars Gene Autry, Lynne Roberts, Sterling Holloway, Adele Mara, James Cardwell, and John Kellogg. The film was released on July 15, 1947, by Republic Pictures.

Plot

Cast 
	
Gene Autry as Gene Autry
Lynne Roberts as Virginia
Sterling Holloway as Droopy Haynes
Adele Mara as Julie
James Cardwell as Duke Mantel 
John Kellogg as Nick
Ray Walker as Detective Lt. Lacey
Archie Twitchell as Jim Prescott
Paul Bryar as Ace
James Flavin as Captain Danforth
Dorothy Vaughan as Mrs. O'Brien
Stanley Andrews as Mr. Hamby 
Al Bridge as Sheriff
The Cass County Boys as Musicians
Bert Dodson as Bass Player Bert
Fred S. Martin as Accordion Player Freddie 
Jerry Scoggins as Guitar Player Jerry

References

External links 
 

1947 films
1940s English-language films
Republic Pictures films
American Western (genre) films
1947 Western (genre) films
Films directed by Lesley Selander
American black-and-white films
1940s American films